Nandeshwar Mahadev Temple (Hindi: नांदेश्वर महादेव मंदिर) is a popular temple of the lord  Shiva in the Udaipur city in the state of Rajasthan, India.

General
Nandeshwar Mahadev is a Hindu temple of Lord Shiva, situated on the State Highway 50, Chaukariya, Rajasthan near Udaipur.

References

External links

Hindu temples in Rajasthan
Shiva temples
Mewar
Tourist attractions in Udaipur district